Rooted is a 1969 Australian play by Alex Buzo.

1985 film

Rooted is a made-for-TV Australian film based on the play by Alex Buzo. It was produced for the Australian Broadcasting Corporation (ABC) and released in 1985.

Cast
Kathleen Allen as Diane
Shane Connor
James Laurie as Bentley
Peter Mochrie as Richard
Genevieve Mooy as Sandy
Terry Serio as Gary
Ian Spence

Production
Buzo was approached to make the film by Alan Burke. "He approached me to do this for what I felt were all the right reasons," said Buzo. "I thought he would do it with style and flair, rather than being pedestrian and naturalistic. But I didn't breathe my sigh of relief with Rooted until I saw the final version."

The film was set in Manly in the mid-sixties. According to Buzo, "I've been told Rooted hasn't dated, but with a telemovie it has got to have a more definite time and place."

Buzo said making a telemovie was tough. "It is so silent, it is like swimming underwater. When I saw the rough cut I was a bit shocked because the film medium seems unsubstantial compared to the stage... I think the stage is more malleable; if something doesn't work you can change it immediately. If something doesn't work on television you just can't go back and change it."

Buzo was happy with the end product. "If all television could turn out like this I would be very happy because if it bad been done badly it would nave reflected on the play. If it is good, it's like having something embalmed, like having St Rooted."

The film remained stylised. "I hate the naturalism of all these mini-series," said Buzo. "It is so boring. I prefer things to be like Rooted, more quirky, like a black comedy."

References

External links

Australian television films
1985 television films
1985 films
Australian films based on plays
Australian plays
1969 plays
1980s English-language films